Rocchetta e Croce is a comune (municipality) in the Province of Caserta in the Italian region Campania, located about  north of Naples and about  northwest of Caserta.

Rocchetta e Croce borders the following municipalities: Calvi Risorta, Formicola, Giano Vetusto, Pietramelara, Riardo, Teano.

References

External links
 Official website

Cities and towns in Campania